The Buick Straight-8 engine (Fireball 8) was produced from 1931 to 1953 and sold in Buick automobiles, replacing the Buick Straight-6 engine across the board in all models in 1931. Like many American automobile makers, Buick adopted the straight-eight engine in 1931 as a more powerful alternative to the previous engines.

Design
Unlike most other car makers at the time, Buick had been using a valve-in-head/OHV overhead valve reverse-flow cylinder head design or I-head since their inception and continued this practice in their straight-eight designs. The engine was sold in different displacements depending on the model of car and the year and was constructed upon two distinct (possibly more) block castings. The engine block in the smaller displacement versions internally resembled the 1937-53 inline Chevrolet 216, 235 & 261" straight six (the combustion chamber design was quite different), albeit with additional cylinders. The large block version (320 cid and 345 cid; used in large-chassis models such as the Roadmaster) was considerably heavier and this weight adversely affected vehicle performance and handling. In earlier years the engines used cast-in-place bearings that were then machined, which made engine rebuilding an expensive procedure, but after 1937 they began using drop-in bearings. The last year for Buick's straight-eight was 1953, but only in the lower-cost Buick Special. All other lines using the same basic chassis received the new V8  Fireball. Starting in 1954, the Special received the V8 as well.

1952 Production Engines and Ratings

See also
 Buick V8 engine
 Buick V6 engine
 Buick Straight-6 engine
 List of GM engines

References

Straight-8
Gasoline engines by model
Straight-eight engines